The New Mexico Taxation and Revenue Department is the state agency responsible for collecting and distributing governmental revenue in New Mexico and administering the state's motor vehicle code. The Taxation and Revenue Department collects taxes within the state and also distributes revenue to support schools and state and local government operations. The Taxation and Revenue Department is also responsible for the regulation of motor vehicles.

See also

Government of New Mexico
New Mexico Motor Vehicle Division

References

External links
 New Mexico Taxation and Revenue Department
New Mexico Motor Vehicle Division

State agencies of New Mexico
US state tax agencies
Economy of New Mexico